Norwegian Dawn is a cruise ship that entered service in 2002 and is in operation with Norwegian Cruise Line.

History
The ship was completed on 4 December 2002 at the Meyer Werft Shipyard in Papenburg, Germany and sailed her maiden voyage in Europe on 7 December 2002.  She was intended to operate with Star Cruises under the name SuperStar Scorpio, but it was decided that she would be delivered to Star's subsidiary, Norwegian Cruise Line as Norwegian Dawn. Norwegian Dawn was christened 16 December 2002, in an elaborate ceremony in Manhattan by actress Kim Cattrall.

Norwegian Dawn was the first NCL vessel to carry hull art. Planned as a way to promote the vessel, the concept was well received and hull art was incorporated on most other NCL vessels, with the exception of those vessels scheduled to transition out of the fleet within the next few years.

Incidents
On 16 April 2005, after sailing into rough weather off the coast of Georgia (U.S. state), Norwegian Dawn encountered a series of three  rogue waves. The third wave damaged several windows on the ninth and tenth decks and several decks were flooded. Damage, however, was not extensive and the ship was quickly repaired.  Four passengers were slightly injured in this incident.

On 27 November 2009, Norwegian Dawn lost all power while returning to Miami. United States Coast Guard ships and helicopters were dispatched to the scene to assist. During the power outage, the more than 2,000 passengers on the ship had no access to running water, electricity, air conditioning or toilet services in the hot Caribbean environment. At least some power was restored and the ship was able to make port in San Juan, PR, not Miami as the itinerary dictated, to allow repairs to be made.

On 27 August 2010, Norwegian Dawn experienced engine problems. The ship had to leave Bermuda early to return to New York at a slower speed.

On 19 May 2015, Norwegian Dawn ran aground in Bermuda shortly after leaving port. The incident was attributed to a minor malfunction in the ship's steering, sending her off course to hit a sandbar. The ship was floated off the sandbar six hours later with the high tide, and allowed to continue to Boston after underwater surveys showed no damage.

On 9 December 2021, Norwegian Dawn was met with a large protest in Key West

Vessel class
Norwegian Dawn was the second in a line of two ships with this design, constructed at Meyer Werft Shipyard in Papenburg, Germany.  Her sister ship is Norwegian Star, which entered service in November 2001.  At the time of their order with Meyer Werft, these two ships were designated as Libra-class (Dawn-class in NCL publicity, as the Libra-class designation was because of its original assignment by Star Cruises until they were assigned to NCL operations). NCL continued using the same class designation for these ships.

References

External links

 NCL Norwegian Dawn
 Meyer Werft shipyard website - Norwegian Dawn
 Norwegian Dawn - last known position

Passenger ships of Norway
Ships of Norwegian Cruise Line
Rogue wave incidents
2002 ships
Ships built in Papenburg
Maritime incidents in 2005
Maritime incidents in 2015